Eat Bulaga! Indonesia is an Indonesian variety and game show produced by Philippine television production company Television and Production Exponents, Inc., which is aired by SCTV Network in Indonesia. It is the Indonesian franchise of Philippines' longest-running noon-time variety show, Eat Bulaga!. Its first incarnation premiered on July 16, 2012 and ended on April 3, 2014.

History 
Malou Choa-Fagar, senior vice president and chief operating officer of Television and Production Exponents Inc., revealed that SCTV first approached them.

Harsiwi Achmad, program director, had been watching the show on YouTube before she moved to SCTV. Achmad felt that the program was entertaining and educating, and that it can spread positive values and get close with the community. Feeling that it would work well with Indonesian audience, Achmad contacted TAPE's marketing creative service advisor, Gerry C. Guzman, who became a way for the SCTV and Filipino executives to negotiate. Kebon Jeruk, director of programs and production at Studio Penta SCTV, also became interested, saying that he wants the program to be as successful as the original. The situation had initially shocked and surprise Filipino television executives. The SCTV executives then went to the Philippines to spend time watch the show and getting a chance to see how it works.

Surya Utama, known by his stage name "Uya Kuya" (literally "Boss Uya", counterpart to Eat Bulaga!'s "Bossing Vic"), a magician and comedian from Bandung, would become the show's main host. His wife, Astrid Khairunnisha, also known by "Astrid Kuya" also co-hosted the show.

The show began simply as "Eat Bulaga! Indonesia", retaining much of the original segments and games played on the Philippine TV show, and premiered on SCTV on July 16, 2012. On July 21, 2012 - Philippine viewers watching on GMA Network got to view a glimpse of the show's opening performance, while the Philippine hosts simultaneously performed the beginning to the show.

Throughout its first year, the show kept in close touch with its original Philippine counterpart. The hosts made many occasional trips to the Philippines to perform with the  hosts of the original show, including a segment where the Indonesian hosts teamed up with their Filipino counterparts to participate in a special segment of Pinoy Henyo: International Version. On December 17, 2012, Filipino singer Christian Bautista made a guest appearance on the show. That same day, Uya Kuya also announced that the show would be airing five days a week instead of three, due to positive feedback and requests from fans. In January 2013, Leo Consul, a Filipino host of the Indonesian show at the time, visited his homeland to perform in front of the Filipino fans, before leaving the show later in the year for unknown and unannounced reasons. Consul's departure from the show triggered an emotional response from the other hosts where Bianca Liza, one of the co-hosts at the time, was seen in tears on-stage. Despite this, Consul's rise to being a host of Eat Bulaga! Indonesia became a legacy and popular story in the Philippines.

The show was popular in Indonesia, making it through one year as the leading TV show in its time slot. Eat Bulaga! Indonesia celebrated its first anniversary at the Indoor Tennis Stadium in Jakarta. The celebration featured a guest appearance by Dahlan Iskan, at the time, Indonesia's minister for state-owned enterprises. Iskan participated on the Indonesia Pintar segment. Various bands and pop groups also performed at the anniversary. The Philippine hosts at the original program also threw a mini-celebration of their own to congratulate the Indonesian accomplishment.

However unfortunately, the show's success would be short-lived, 2014 would be its last year with SCTV. Uya Kuya left the show amid its final days, causing the show's ratings to drop drastically. Thus, thus would lead to the show's cancellation on April 3, 2014 and was replaced by FTV Sore.

Schedule 
The first incarnation of Eat Bulaga! Indonesia aired at 2:30 pm (WIB)/3:30 pm (PST), a deviation from the original which is broadcast at noon. This was done to consider the viewers' prayer time (salat) according to Islam. The first season was set for 13 weeks, as a trial period. The show was cancelled after April 3, 2014 and it was replaced by FTV Sore which shows Indonesian television films.

Presenter 

Andhika Pratama (2013-2014)
Farid Aja (2012-2014)
Reza Bukan (2012-2014)
Narji (2012-2014)
Rian Ibram (2012-2014)
Rio Indrawan (2012-2014)
Jenny Tan (2012-2014)
Bianca Liza (2012-2014)
Christie Julia (2012-2014)
Christina Colondam (Juara Miss Celebrity 2012) (2013-2014)
Ivan Gunawan (2013-2014)
Gading Marten (2014)
Aaron Ashab (2012)
Selfi Nafillah (2012)
Selena Alesandra (2012-2013)
Wijaya (2012)
Ramzi (2012)
Ciripa (2012)
Leo Consul (2012-2013)
Steven Muliawan (2012-2013)
Tora Sudiro (2013)
Uya Kuya (2012-2013)
Astrid Kuya (2012-2014)

Guest Star Presenter 
Mpok Nori
Titiek Puspa
Daus Mini
Mpok Atik
Saiful Jamil
Ussy Sulistiawaty
Melaney Ricardo
Tyson Linch
Cinta Kuya

References

External links 

 SCTV program page

Indonesian variety television shows
2012 Indonesian television series debuts
2014 Indonesian television series endings
Indonesian-language television shows
Eat Bulaga!
SCTV (TV network) original programming
Television series by TAPE Inc.
Indonesian television series based on Philippine television series